Crithidia otongatchiensis is a species of monoxenous trypanosomatid. It is known to parasitise Brachycera flies, and was first found in Ecuador.

References

Further reading
Votýpka, Jan, et al. "Kentomonas gen. n., a New Genus of Endosymbiont-containing Trypanosomatids of Strigomonadinae subfam. n." Protist 165.6 (2014): 825–838.

External links

Parasitic excavates
Parasites of Diptera
Trypanosomatida